James Hayllar (1829–1920) was an English genre, portrait and landscape painter.

Life and work

Hayllar was born in Chichester in Sussex (now West Sussex), and received his training in art at Cary's Art Academy in London; he painted Cary's portrait in 1851. He went on to study at the Royal Academy.
Hayllar travelled in Italy from 1851–53. He was a regular exhibitor at the Royal Academy from 1851–98, and also showed work at the British Institution and the Royal Society of British Artists (RBA) - of which he was a member. He first became known as a portrait painter but later turned his brush to genre art, often featuring pretty young girls (see first painting); his work became very popular. With George Dunlop Leslie (who also lived in Wallingford at the same time), he painted a large portrait of Queen Victoria to celebrate her Golden Jubilee in 1887 - the painting now hangs in Wallingford Town Hall. along with another 10 of his paintings. The Art UK website also indicates the location of further works by Hayllar in other UK public galleries.The Victoria and Albert Museum possesses his oil painting Granville Sharp the Abolitionist Rescuing a Slave from the Hands of His MasterHayllar's work was also used for advertising purposes. In 1887 Thomas J. Barratt bought the painting Soap Suds for use as an advertisement  for Pears (soap). It was renamed This is the way we wash our hands.

It is interesting to note that Hayllar could sometimes receive rather mixed criticism as shown in The Atheneum's report on the entries  in the 1861 exhibition of the RBA. It is an expression of regret at the large number of minor works submitted by such an able artist

The local press could be more positive, particularly where a full-sized painting is described, as shown by the Reading Mercury's reasonably accurate description of The first born at the cottage in 1881.

There is a photograph of the painting, which was displayed at the Royal Academy exhibition in 1881, in an article by Christopher Wood, in the April 1974 edition of The Connoisseur. It is thought that the two women admiring the baby are Jessica and Edith Hayllar.

He married Edith Phoebe Cavell (1827–1899), the aunt of Edith Cavell - the famous British nurse who was to be shot by the Germans for "treason" during World War I. They lived at a house called "Castle Priory" in Wallingford on the River Thames in Berkshire (now Oxfordshire) from 1875–99; scenes from village life in the area often featured in his work there. The couple went on to have 9 children, of whom four became recognised artists (see below). After the death of his wife in 1899, he moved to Bournemouth.

Family

Hayllar had four sons and five daughters, four of whom, Edith Hayllar (1860–1948), Jessica Hayllar (1858–1940), Mary Hayllar (1863–c. 1950), and Kate Hayllar (fl. 1883–1900), became notable artists in their own right; all received their training from their father and exhibited at the Royal Academy.

References

Further reading

J Johnson and A Greutzner (2008). British Artists 1880-1940. Sandy lane, Old Martelsham, Woodbridge,Suffolk IP12 4SD: Antique Collectors Club. p. 238. ISBN 978-0-902028-36-4.
Wood, Christopher. Victorian Painters, the text (Antique Collectors' Club, 1995) p. 235 ff.
Wilder, Anthony. Victorian artists of Wallingford: A Tale of Two Dynasties - The Hayllar & Leslie  Families (Pie Powder Press, 2006).

External links

James Hayllar online (Artcyclopedia)
James Hayllar on Artnet
The Centre of Attraction (Oil on canvas, 1891 - Lady Lever Art Gallery)
Works by James Hayllar (Children in art history)
In the hayfield (Oil on canvas, 1884 - Christie's)
A Fly fisherman (Oil on board, 1879 - Christie's)
  James Hayllar by Dickinson brothers, albumen carte-de-visite, 1860s (National Portrait Gallery, London, UK)

19th-century English painters
English male painters
20th-century English painters
English portrait painters
Landscape artists
19th-century painters of historical subjects
British genre painters
People from Chichester
1829 births
1920 deaths
20th-century English male artists
19th-century English male artists